Ian Osterloh is a British clinical researcher for Pfizer, Inc. who led the development of sildenafil citrate (Viagra), as well as a number of Pfizer medications for cardiovascular disease.

References

Living people
British scientists
People educated at The Portsmouth Grammar School
Pfizer people
Year of birth missing (living people)